Meteș is a commune located in Alba County, Transylvania, Romania. It has a population of 2,860 (2011). It is composed of twelve villages: Ampoița, Isca, Lunca Ampoiței, Lunca Meteșului, Meteș, Pădurea, Poiana Ampoiului, Poiana Ursului, Presaca Ampoiului, Remetea, Tăuți, and Văleni.

It is crossed by national road , which connects Alba Iulia to Zlatna, Abrud, and Brad further west.

References

Communes in Alba County
Localities in Transylvania